Leopold (Lee) Masterson (born 1985, Cedar Rapids, Iowa) is an American visual and conceptual artist.

Work 
Leopold Masterson lives and works in New York City.  Working across many mediums he has performed, installed and exhibited his work internationally.  His work is in collections including the Grassi Museum (Leipzig, Germany),  the Smithsonian Libraries (Washington, D.C.), Cooper Hewitt, Smithsonian Design Museum (New York, NY),  Cedar Rapids Museum of Art (Cedar Rapids, IA), Christian Petersen Art Museum (Ames, Iowa), and LongHouse Reserve (East Hampton, NY).  Two of Masterson's publications, "Volume One" and "2013, 2023" have been digitized by the Smithsonian Libraries for public viewing.

Education 
Masterson graduated from the University of Iowa in 2007 with a Bachelor of Science in Nursing and in 2008 with a Bachelor of Fine Arts.  He received a Master of Fine Arts in Ceramic in 2011 from the Rhode Island School of Design.

Further reading 
 Chunghi Choo and Her Students (2020), Arnoldsche Publishers.
 Emojis: The Secret Behind the Smile (2017), Cisco Books.
 Mapping the Intelligence of Artistic Work (2011), Moth Press.

References

External links 
 Official Website  *Works published by Leopold Masterson at the Smithsonian Digital Library.

Living people
American conceptual artists
New media artists
Street artists
Rhode Island School of Design alumni
1985 births